Zhang Zhiwan(1811–1897), courtesy name Ziqing(), art name Luanpo(), was a Qing dynasty statesman and painter. He was the cousin of another prominent late Qing politician Zhang Zhidong.

Life 
Zhang Zhiwan was born into a prestigious local gentry family in Nanpi. His father Zhang Yuce served as a low rank official in Zhili.

Zhang's career as an official started after he passed the imperial examination as one of the three highest rank Jinshi. His first post, in the Hanlin Academy, was the compiler of chronicles. During the Taiping Rebellion, he worked as an advisor for the Qing court. Around the year of 1863, he defeated the peasants of Nian rebellion in Nanyang and Runan, at the time, he was under the military command of Sengge Rinchen. He was then moved to northern Jiangsu and was in charge of the defensives against Nian peasants until the end of the Nian rebellion.

Zhang Zhiwan held the post of viceroy of water transport between 1866 and 1870. In 1871, he served shortly as the viceroy of Minzhe before being  promoted to the position of the minister of war.

In 1882, he was conferred the title of Secretary of Grand Secretariat. In 1884, he gained the access to the Grand Council and worked there for ten years. His colleague and superior in the council was prince Shiduo of Li. Upon the touching off of the First Sino-Japanese War, he retired himself due to his old age. He died in the year of 1897, aged 87. The imperial court bestowed the posthumous name Wenda on him. The title he held before his death was the grand secretary of the eastern pavilion().

Family 
Zhiwan had two sons
Zhang Jiayin(1822-1882)
Zhang Ruiyin(1867-1922)
and four grandchildren.
Zhang Chongfu, spouse of Li Fuzeng
Zhang Yuanji
Zhang Kuizheng
Zhang Baohua
Great Grandson
 Zhang Jigao

References

Further reading 
 

1811 births
1897 deaths
Politicians from Cangzhou
Qing dynasty politicians from Hebei
Grand Councillors of the Qing dynasty
Grand Secretaries of the Qing dynasty
Assistant Grand Secretaries
Viceroys of Min-Zhe